Group B of the 1999 Fed Cup Asia/Oceania Zone Group I was one of two pools in the Asia/Oceania Zone Group I of the 1999 Fed Cup. Five teams competed in a round robin competition, with the top team advancing to the Group I play-off, the winner of which would advance to World Group II Play-offs, and the bottom team being relegated down to 2000 Group II.

South Korea vs. New Zealand

China vs. Hong Kong

South Korea vs. China

Pacific Oceania vs. Hong Kong

South Korea vs. Hong Kong

Pacific Oceania vs. New Zealand

Pacific Oceania vs. South Korea

New Zealand vs. China

New Zealand vs. Hong Kong

Pacific Oceania vs. China

  placed last in the pool, and thus was relegated to Group II in 2000, where they achieved advancement back into Group I for 2001.

See also
Fed Cup structure

References

External links
 Fed Cup website

1999 Fed Cup Asia/Oceania Zone